First Premier Bank, headquartered in Sioux Falls, South Dakota, is an issuer of MasterCard brand credit cards in the United States. The bank is known for specializing in a wide range of subprime credit cards that are marketed to individuals with low credit scores.

History
The bank was founded in 1986 and is owned and controlled by T. Denny Sanford. In 2020, Sanford was being investigated for possession of child pornography. Investigators obtained a search warrant prior to referring the case to the United States Department of Justice. The criminal investigation was ongoing as of January 2022 at both the state and federal levels.

The typical First Premier Bank MasterCard user uses the card for about 18 months before moving to another card with better terms; Sanford described the company as offering a "lifeline" for those with poor credit.
 
In 2014, it was announced that First Premier Bank sued cardhub.com for allowing customers to view rates and terms and also letting users review the card. The lawsuit was dropped months later.

Legal actions against 

In 2007, the bank settled a case with the New York Attorney General who claimed the bank used deceptive practices to market its credit cards. The bank paid $4.5 million as part of the deal.

Criticisms 

As of December 2010, First Premier Bank was reportedly offering a credit card with a 79.9% interest rate and a $300 limit. This was cited by Senator Bernie Sanders as an example of what he called "extortion and loan sharking".

First Premier Bank's CEO, Dana J. Dykhouse, was referenced in a 2014 piece in the Argus Leader as belonging to a group of would-be local benefactors who the author wrote, "should quit gouging poor people who can't make it from paycheck to paycheck, or don't qualify for regular credit cards. ... Loan sharks who charge an obscene profit just because they can don't make good community leaders."

Reviews 
In April 2018, John Kiernan of WalletHub, a personal finance website, ranked the First Premier Bank MasterCard poorly (1 stars out of 5). He wrote that the card had excessive fees, low credit limit and a high annual percentage rate that made it a bad choice for most users.

Awards 
- Two 2023 Gold Stevie Awards: Contact Center of the Year and Front-Line Customer Service Team of the Year. 

- Bronze 2023 Stevie for Customer Service Management Team of the Year.

- Best Banks to Work For - American Banker Magazine 2015, 2016, 2017, 2018, 2019, 2020, 2021, 2022

See also
 First National Bank of Norden

References

External links

Banks based in South Dakota